The Italian Society of Medical and Interventional Radiology is a medical association of Italian radiologists, consisting of about 11,000 members (in 2019).

External links
Official website

Radiology organizations
Interventional radiology
Medical and health organisations based in Italy